This is a list of notable individuals and organizations who have voiced their endorsement of Pete Buttigieg's campaign for the Democratic Party's nomination for the 2020 U.S. presidential election.

Federal officials

U.S. Representatives

Current 
 Pete Visclosky, U.S. Representative from IN-01 since 1985
 Dave Loebsack, U.S. Representative from IA-02 since 2007
 Anthony Brown, U.S. Representative from MD-04 since 2017; former Lieutenant Governor of Maryland (2007–2015)
 Annie Kuster, U.S. Representative from NH-02 since 2013
 Kathleen Rice, U.S. Representative from NY-04 since 2015 (previously endorsed Beto O'Rourke)
 Don Beyer, U.S. Representative from VA-08 since 2015; former U.S. Ambassador to Switzerland and Liechtenstein (2009–2013); former Lieutenant Governor of Virginia (1990–1998)
 Andy Kim, U.S. Representative from NJ-03 since 2018 (previously endorsed Cory Booker)

Former 
 Patrick Murphy, former U.S. Representative from PA-08 (2007–2011), former Under Secretary of the Army (2016–2017), former Acting United States Secretary of the Army (2016)

White House officials

Former 
 David Cohen, former CIA Deputy Director for Operations (1995–1997)
 Linda Douglass, former director of communications for the White House Office of Health Reform
 Eric Fanning, former Secretary of the Army (2016–2017)
 Austan Goolsbee, former chairman of the Council of Economic Advisers
 Philip Gordon, former Assistant Secretary of State (2009–2013), former special assistant to Obama (2013–2015)
 Reggie Love, former special assistant and personal aide to Barack Obama
 Ned Price, former National Security Council Spokesman
 Frank Sanchez, former Under Secretary of Commerce for International Trade (2010–2013)
 Vali Nasr, former State Department advisor (2010–2012)

U.S. Ambassadors

Former 
 Tim Broas, former U.S. Ambassador to the Netherlands (2014–2016) (Co-endorsement with Joe Biden)
 William Eacho, former U.S. Ambassador to Austria (2009–2013) (Co-endorsement with Joe Biden)
 Peter Galbraith, former Deputy UN Envoy to Afghanistan (2009) and former U.S. Ambassador to Croatia (1993–1998)
 David Jacobson, former U.S. Ambassador to Canada (2009–2013)
 John R. Phillips, former U.S. Ambassador to Italy (2009–2013); former U.S. Ambassador to San Marino (2009–2013)
 Theodore Sedgwick, former U.S. Ambassador to Slovakia (2010–2015)
 Suzan "Suzi" LeVine, former U.S. Ambassador to Switzerland (2014–2017)

State officials

State executive officials

Current 
 Henry Beck, State Treasurer of Maine since 2019, former Member of the Maine House of Representatives (2008–2016)
 Cyrus Habib, Lieutenant Governor of Washington since 2017, former member of the Washington Senate (2015–2017), former member of the Washington House of Representatives (2013–2015)
 Eleni Kounalakis, Lieutenant Governor of California since 2019, former U.S. Ambassador to Hungary (2010–2013) (previously endorsed Kamala Harris)

State legislators

Current 
Sorted by states, role and family name
 Jennifer Arndt, Colorado Representative from the 53rd District of Colorado since 2015;
 Bob Duff, Connecticut State Senator and Majority Leader of the Connecticut State Senate since 2015; Connecticut State Representative from the 25th District since 2005
 Loranne Ausley, Florida State Representative from District 9 since 2016
 Ben Diamond, Florida State Representative from District 68 since 2016
 Adam Hattersley, Florida State Representative from District 59 since 2018
 Matthew Wilson, Georgia State Representative from District 80 since 2019
 Stephanie Kifowit, Illinois State Representative from District 84 since 2013
 Lamont Robinson, Illinois State Representative from the 5th District since 2019
 Tony Bisignano, Iowa State Senator from District 34 (1993–1997) and District 17 (2015–present); former Iowa State Representative from District 80 (1987–1993)
 William Dotzler, Iowa State Senator from the 11th district, former Iowa State Representative from District 26 (1997–2003)
 Brian Meyer, Iowa State Representative from District 33 since 2013 (Previously endorsed Beto O'Rourke)
 Jo Oldson, Iowa State Representative since 2003 from District 41 (since 2013) and from District 61 (2003–2013)
 Scott Ourth, Iowa State Representative from District 26 since 2013
 Kristin Sunde, Iowa State Representative from District 42 (2019–present)
 Phyllis Thede, Iowa State House Representative from District 93 since 2009 (previously endorsed Kamala Harris)
 Kirill Reznik, Maryland Delegate from the 39th district since 2007
 Pat Young, Maryland Delegate from the 44th district since 2015
 Will Smith, Maryland
 Senator from the 20th District since 2016
 Michael Rodrigues, Massachusetts State Senator from Bristol and Plymouth District 1 since 2011; former Massachusetts State Representative from Bristol District 8 (1996–2011)
 Adam Hollier, Michigan State Senator from the 2nd District since 2018
 Sandra Jauregui, Nevada Assemblywoman from the 41st District since 2016 (Previously endorsed Kamala Harris)
 Susan Almy, New Hampshire State Representative from Grafton District 13 since 1996
 Martha Hennessey, New Hampshire State Senator from New Hampshire's 5th State Senate District since 2016; New Hampshire State Representative from the Grafton 12th District 2014–2016 (Previously endorsed Cory Booker)
 Joelle Martin, New Hampshire State Representative from Hillsborough District 23 since 2016
 David Morrill, New Hampshire State Representative from Cheshire District 4 since 2018
 Andrew O'Hearne, New Hampshire State Representative from Sullivan District 3 since 2008
 Cole Riel, New Hampshire State Representative from Hillsborough District 6 since 2018
 Matt Wilhelm, New Hampshire State Representative from Hillsborough District 42 since 2018
 Amy Paulin, New York State Assemblywoman from District 88 since 2001
 Robert J. Rodriguez, New York State Assemblyman from District 68 since 2011
James Skoufis, New York State Senator from District 39 since 2019
Grier Martin, Member of the North Carolina House of Representatives from Wake County since 2005
 Joshua Boschee, Minority Leader of the North Dakota House of Representatives since 2018; North Dakota House of Representatives from District 44 since 2012
 Casey Weinstein, Ohio State Representative from District 37 since 2019
 Ryan W. Pearson, Senior Deputy Majority Leader of the Rhode Island Senate since 2018; Rhode Island State Senator from District 19 since 2013
 K. Joseph Shekarchi, Majority Leader of the Rhode Island House of Representatives since 2017 and Rhode Island State Representative for District 23 since 2013
 Justine Caldwell, Rhode Island State Representative for District 30 since 2019
 J. A. Moore, South Carolina State Representative from District 15 since 2019 (previously endorsed Kamala Harris)
 Jeff Yarbro, Minority Leader of the Tennessee Senate since 2019; Tennessee State Senator from District 21 since 2015
 Adam Ebbin, Virginia State Senator from Alexandria, Arlington County and Fairfax County in the 30th district

Former 
 Sean Shaw, former Florida State Representative from District 61 (2016–2018) and 2018 Democratic nominee for Attorney General of Florida
 Steve Warnstadt, former Iowa State Senator from District 1 (2003–2011); former Iowa State Representative from District 2 (1995–2003)
 Daryl Beall, former Iowa State Senator from District 5 (2003–2015)
 Jean Hall Lloyd-Jones, former Iowa State Senator from District 23 (1987–1995); former Iowa State Representative from District 73 (1979–1983) and District 46 (1983–1987); first Iowa woman nominated by a major party for the U.S. Senate
 John Wittneben, former Iowa State Representative for District 7 (2011–2013) (Previously endorsed Klobuchar)
 Andrew Wenthe, former Iowa State Representative for District 18 (2007–2013); mayor of Fayette, Iowa since 2014
 Paul Scherrman, former Iowa State Representative for District 33 (1997–2003)
 Mike Moreland, former Iowa State Representative for District 39 (1993–1998)
 Thomas Fey, former Iowa State Representative for District 81 (1982) and District 41 (1983–1990)
 Deborah Berry, former Iowa State Representative from District 22 (2003–2012) and District 62 (2012–2017)
 Patricia Farley, former Nevada State Senator for District 8 (2014–2018)
 Bonnie Parnell, former Nevada Assemblywoman for District 40 (2004–2010)
 Rick Trombly, former New Hampshire State Senator from District 7 (1998–2000); former New Hampshire State Representative from Merrimack 10 (1978–1984) and Merrimack 4 (1986–1998) and former New Hampshire House of Representatives Democratic Floor Leader; executive director of the New Hampshire State Teachers Association since 2012
 Mark Fernald, former New Hampshire State Senator for District 11 (1998–2002)
 Andrew White, former New Hampshire State Representative for Grafton District 13 (2009–2018)
 Joe Schiavoni, former Ohio State Senator for District 33 (2009–2018), Former Senate Minority Leader of the Ohio Senate
 James Celebrezze, former Ohio State Representative from District 4 (1967–1974) and former judge on the Supreme Court of Ohio

Municipal officials

Mayors

Current 
 Steve Adler, Mayor of Austin, Texas since 2015
 Andy Berke, Mayor of Chattanooga, Tennessee since 2013
 Rosalynn Bliss, Mayor of Grand Rapids, Michigan since 2016
 Noam Bramson, Mayor of New Rochelle, New York since 2006
 Luke Bronin, Mayor of Hartford, Connecticut since 2016
 Christopher Cabaldon, Mayor of West Sacramento, California since 1998
 Tracie M. Clemons, Mayor of Norway, South Carolina since 2019 
 John Cranley, Mayor of Cincinnati, Ohio since 2013
 Michelle De La Isla, Mayor of Topeka, Kansas since 2018
 Jim Donchess, Mayor of Nashua, New Hampshire, since 2015
 Jorge Elorza, Mayor of Providence, Rhode Island since 2015
 Leirion Gaylor Baird, Mayor of Lincoln, Nebraska since 2019
 Reed Gusciora, Mayor of Trenton, New Jersey since 2018
 Steve Hagerty, Mayor of Evanston, Illinois since 2017
 Joe Hogsett, Mayor of Indianapolis, Indiana since 2016
 Christine Hunschofsky, Mayor of Parkland, Florida since 2017
 Lydia Lavelle, Mayor of Carrboro, North Carolina since 2013
Thomas McDermott Jr., Mayor of Hammond, Indiana since 2004
Lauren McLean, Mayor of Boise, Idaho since 2020
Erin Mendenhall, Mayor of Salt Lake City since 2020
 James Mueller, Mayor of South Bend, Indiana since 2020
 Tari Renner, Mayor of Bloomington, Illinois since 2013
 Terence Roberts, Mayor of Anderson, South Carolina since 2006 (previously endorsed Cory Booker)
 Dean Trantalis, Mayor of Fort Lauerdale, Florida since 2018
 Nan Whaley, Mayor of Dayton, Ohio since 2014
 Jenny Wilson, Mayor of Salt Lake County, Utah since 2019

Former 
 Jim Gray, former mayor of Lexington, Kentucky (2011–2019)
 Betsy Hodges, former mayor of Minneapolis, Minnesota (2006–2014)
 Sly James, former mayor of Kansas City, Missouri (2011–2019)
 Mark Kleinschmidt, former mayor of Chapel Hill, North Carolina (2009–2015)
 Linda Langston, former Linn County, Iowa supervisor
 Nelda Martinez, former mayor of the City of Corpus Christi, Texas (2012–2016), former Member of Corpus Christi City Council from the at-large district (2007–2012)
 Annise Parker, former mayor of Houston, Texas (2010–2016), 14th City Controller of Houston (2004–2010), former Member of the Houston City Council (1998–2004)
 Michael Signer, former mayor of Charlottesville, Virginia (2016–2018)
 Ted Wilson, former mayor of Salt Lake City, Utah (1976–1985)

Other local officials

Current 
Sim Gill, district attorney for Salt Lake County, Utah since 2010
Bryan Newland, chair of the Bay Mills Indian Community
Danny O'Connor, Franklin County Auditor, Columbus, Ohio; 2018 special election nominee for the Ohio's 12th congressional district
Pat Ryan, County Executive for Ulster County, New York since 2019

Party officials

DNC members

Current 
 Colleen Condon, chair of the Charleston County South Carolina Democratic Party 
 Keith Harper, member of the 2020 Democratic National Committee

Former 
 Steven Grossman, former chair of the Democratic National Committee (1997–1999); former chair of the Massachusetts Democratic Party (1991–1993)
 Susan W. Turnbull, former vice chair of the Democratic National Committee (2009–2011); former chair of the Maryland Democratic Party (2009–2011)

Notable individuals

Businesspeople 
 Paul Tudor Jones, hedge fund manager
 Gary Hirshberg, co-founder and former CEO of Stonyfield Farm
 Ken Harbaugh, former United States Navy veteran (1996–2005), Democratic nominee for Ohio's 7th congressional district in 2018 and nonprofit executive
 Jana McKeag, Cherokee Nation, president of Lowry Strategies

Activists 
 David Mixner, civil rights activist and author

International politicians 
 Sadiq Khan, current mayor of London

Celebrities

Actors and artists 
 Jennifer Aniston, actress
Tom Colicchio, celebrity chef
Kevin Costner, actor
 David Crosby, musician
 Alan Cumming, actor
 Lee Daniels, director
 Robert De Niro, actor
 Portia De Rossi, actress and model
Mark Duplass, actor
 Shepard Fairey, artist
 Jenna Fischer, actress
 Michael J. Fox, actor
 Ben Harper, musician
 Jane Lynch, actress
 Seth MacFarlane, actor, animator and filmmaker
 Mandy Moore, singer-songwriter and actress
 Chloë Grace Moretz, actress
 Kevin Nash, professional wrestler and actor
 Gwyneth Paltrow, actress and businesswoman
 Sarah Jessica Parker, actress
 Pedro Pascal, actor
 Ben Platt, actor
Rob Reiner, actor
Ryan Reynolds, actor
Anne Rice, author
 Emmy Rossum, actress, television director, singer-songwriter
 John Stamos, actor
 Sharon Stone, actress
 George Takei, actor and activist
 Lauren Tom, actress
 Bradley Whitford, actor

Athletes and sports figures 
 Collin Martin, soccer player
 Greg Louganis, diver

Media personalities 
 Ryann Richardson, Miss Black America 2018, political activist

Organizations

Newspapers 

El Paso Times
Sentinel Colorado
The State (newspaper)
The San Diego Union-Tribune
Bay Area Reporter
Falls Church News-Press
Orlando Sentinel

Political action committees 
 Equality California
 LGBTQ Victory Fund
 VoteVets
 Garden State Equality

References

External links 
 
 Official website

2020 United States presidential election endorsements
Pete Buttigieg 2020 presidential campaign endorsements
Lists of United States presidential candidate endorsements